Stronghold is the name of a neighborhood in Ward 5 of Northeast Washington D.C. Stronghold is contained between Michigan Avenue N.E. to the north, North Capitol Street N.W. to the west, and Glenwood Cemetery to both the south and east. Stronghold borders the adjacent neighborhoods of Edgewood, University Heights, and Brookland in Ward 5 of Northeast Washington D.C. 

Stronghold is sandwiched between the campuses of two colleges: Trinity University, which lies west of 4th Street NE; and The Catholic University of America, which lies on the opposite side of Michigan Avenue N.E. .

In terms of public transportation, residents of Stronghold live within very close proximity to the Brookland-CUA Metro Station, which is served by the Washington Metropolitan Area Red Line.

References

Catholic University of America
Neighborhoods in Northeast (Washington, D.C.)